Zipser German (German: Zipserisch or Zipserdeutsch; Hungarian: szepességi szász nyelv or cipszer nyelv) is dialect of the German language which developed in the Upper Zips region of what is now northeastern Slovakia among people who settled there from present-day central Germany beginning in the 13th century (during the High Middle Ages as part of the Ostsiedlung). These German settlers are collectively known as Zipser Germans in Central Europe and as Carpathian Germans in their native Slovakia. The Lower Zips was inhabited by other Germans who spoke a different dialect called "Gründlerisch". The Upper Zipser German dialect is also close or related to the Transylvanian Saxon dialect.

Beginning in at least the 18th century, many Zipsers migrated to contemporary northern Romania, including to southern Bukovina, where several other Germanic dialects were also spoken. Over time, the speech of the Zipsers in present-day Romania was heavily influenced by that of people from Upper Austria who settled among them and were ultimately assimilated into the Zipser ethnic community. During and after the Second World War, most Zipsers evacuated or were expelled to Germany, but a community of speakers remains in Hopgarten; their distinctive dialect is called "Outzäpsersch" (German: "Altzipserisch", literally "Old Zipserish").

Dialectal differences 

The dialect spoken in Bukovina, Gründlerisch in origin, was characterized by the shift of original (Middle High German) /v/ to /b/ and of original /b/ to /p/. The dialect of Hopgarten distinctively shifts Middle High German /l/, in all positions, to 'u'.

References 

West Germanic languages
Languages of Slovakia
Languages of Romania
Languages of Ukraine
Languages of Germany
German dialects
Carpathian German people